Andrew Cavedon (born 5 November 1971) is a former Australian rules footballer who played for the Fitzroy Football Club and Carlton Football Club in the Australian Football League (AFL). He attended Princes Hill Secondary College in Carlton North.

Notes

External links

Andrew Cavedon's profile at Blueseum

1971 births
Carlton Football Club players
Fitzroy Football Club players
Lalor Football Club players
Living people
Australian rules footballers from Victoria (Australia)